List of flags with the Cross of Trier in heraldry contains the flags with the Red Cross of the Archbishopric of Trier, that existed from the end of the 9th to the early 19th century.

States

Counties and county-free cities

Associated municipalities

Cities and municipalities 

Trier
Flag